The classical or traditional Mongolian script, also known as the Hudum Mongol bichig, was the first writing system created specifically for the Mongolian language, and was the most widespread until the introduction of Cyrillic in 1946. It is traditionally written in vertical lines . Derived from the Old Uyghur alphabet, it is a true alphabet, with separate letters for consonants and vowels. It has been adapted for such languages as Oirat and Manchu. Alphabets based on this classical vertical script continue to be used in Mongolia and Inner Mongolia to write Mongolian, Xibe and, experimentally, Evenki.

Computer operating systems have been slow to adopt support for Mongolian script; almost all have incomplete support or other text rendering difficulties.

History 

The Mongolian vertical script developed as an adaptation of the Old Uyghur alphabet for the Mongolian language. From the seventh and eighth to the fifteenth and sixteenth centuries, the Mongolian language separated into southern, eastern and western dialects. The principal documents from the period of the Middle Mongol language are: in the eastern dialect, the famous text The Secret History of the Mongols, monuments in the Square script, materials of the Chinese–Mongolian glossary of the fourteenth century and materials of the Mongolian language of the middle period in Chinese transcription, etc.; in the western dialect, materials of the Arab–Mongolian and Persian–Mongolian dictionaries, Mongolian texts in Arabic transcription, etc. The main features of the period are that the vowels ï and i had lost their phonemic significance, creating the i phoneme (in the Chakhar dialect, the Standard Mongolian in Inner Mongolia, these vowels are still distinct); inter-vocal consonants γ/g, b/w had disappeared and the preliminary process of the formation of Mongolian long vowels had begun; the initial h was preserved in many words; grammatical categories were partially absent, etc. The development over this period explains why the Mongolian script looks like a vertical Arabic script (in particular the presence of the dot system).

Various schools of orthography, some using diacritics, were developed to avoid ambiguity.

Traditional Mongolian is written vertically from top to bottom, flowing in lines from left to right. The Old Uyghur script and its descendants, of which traditional Mongolian is one among Oirat Clear, Manchu, and Buryat are the only known vertical scripts written from left to right. This developed because the Uyghurs rotated their Sogdian-derived script, originally written right to left, 90 degrees counterclockwise to emulate Chinese writing, but without changing the relative orientation of the letters.

The reed pen was the writing instrument of choice until the 18th century, when the brush took its place under Chinese influence. Pens were also historically made of wood, reed, bamboo, bone, bronze, or iron. Ink used was black or cinnabar red, and written with on birch bark, paper, cloths made of silk or cotton, and wooden or silver plates.

Mongols learned their script as a syllabary, dividing the syllables into twelve different classes, based on the final phonemes of the syllables, all of which ended in vowels.

The script remained in continuous use by Mongolian speakers in Inner Mongolia in the People's Republic of China. In the Mongolian People's Republic, it was largely replaced by the Mongolian Cyrillic alphabet, although the vertical script remained in limited use. In March 2020, the Mongolian government announced plans to increase the use of the traditional Mongolian script and to use both Cyrillic and Mongolian script in official documents by 2025. However, due to the particularity of the traditional Mongolian script, a large part of the Sinicized Mongols in China can't identify the script, and in many cases the script is only used symbolically on plaques in many cities.

Names 
The script is known by a wide variety of names. As it was derived from the Old Uyghur alphabet, the Mongol script is known as the Uighur(-)Mongol script. From 1941 onwards, it became known as the Old Script, in contrast to the New Script, referring to Cyrillic. The Mongolian script is also known as the Hudum or 'not exact' script,, in comparison with the Todo 'clear, exact' script .

Overview 
The traditional or classical Mongolian alphabet, sometimes called Hudum 'traditional' in Oirat in contrast to the Clear script (Todo 'exact'), is the original form of the Mongolian script used to write the Mongolian language. It does not distinguish several vowels (/, /, final /) and consonants (syllable-initial / and /, sometimes /) that were not required for Uyghur, which was the source of the Mongol (or Uyghur-Mongol) script. The result is somewhat comparable to the situation of English, which must represent ten or more vowels with only five letters and uses the digraph th for two distinct sounds. Ambiguity is sometimes prevented by context, as the requirements of vowel harmony and syllable sequence usually indicate the correct sound. Moreover, as there are few words with an exactly identical spelling, actual ambiguities are rare for a reader who knows the orthography.

Letters have different forms depending on their position in a word: initial, medial, or final. In some cases, additional graphic variants are selected for visual harmony with the subsequent character.

The rules for writing below apply specifically for the Mongolian language, unless stated otherwise.

Sort orders 
 Traditional: , /, /, ...
 Other modern orderings that apply to specific dictionaries also exist.

Vowel harmony 
Mongolian vowel harmony separates the vowels of words into three groups – two mutually exclusive and one neutral:
 The neutral vowel , able to appear in all words.

Any Mongolian word can contain the neutral vowel , but only vowels from either of the other two groups. The vowel qualities of visually separated vowels and suffixes must likewise harmonize with those of the preceding word stem. Such suffixes are written with front or neutral vowels when preceded by a word stem containing only neutral vowels. Any of these rules might not apply for foreign words however.

Separated final vowels 

This form requires a final-shaped preceding letter, and an inter-word gap in between. This gap can be transliterated with a hyphen.

The presence or lack of a separated  or  can also indicate differences in meaning between different words (compare   'black' with   'to look').

Its form could be confused with that of the identically shaped traditional dative-locative suffix / exemplified further down. That form however, is more commonly found in older texts, and more commonly takes the forms of  / or  / instead.

Separated suffixes 

All case suffixes, as well as any plural suffixes consisting of one or two syllables, are likewise separated by a preceding and hyphen-transliterated gap. A maximum of two case suffixes can be added to a stem.

Such single-letter vowel suffixes appear with the final-shaped forms of /, or /, as in   'to the country' and   'on the day', or   'the state' etc. Multi-letter suffixes most often start with an initial- (consonants), medial- (vowels), or variant-shaped form. Medial-shaped  in the two-letter suffix  / is exemplified in the adjacent newspaper logo.

Consonant clusters 
Two medial consonants are the most that can come together in original Mongolian words. There are however, a few loanwords that can begin or end with two or more.

Compound names 
In the modern language, proper names (but not words) usually forms graphic compounds (such as those of   'Jasper-jewel' or   – the city of Hohhot). These also allow components of different harmonic classes to be joined together, and where the vowels of an added suffix will harmonize with those of the latter part of the compound. Orthographic peculiarities are most often retained, as with the short and long teeth of an initial-shaped   in   'Bad Girl' (protective name).

Isolate citation forms 

Letters

Native Mongolian

Galik characters 

In 1587, the translator and scholar Ayuush Güüsh created the Galik alphabet, inspired by the third Dalai Lama, Sonam Gyatso. It primarily added extra characters for transcribing Tibetan and Sanskrit terms when translating religious texts, and later also from Chinese. Some of those characters are still in use today for writing foreign names (as listed below).

Syllabary

Punctuation and numerals

Punctuation 

When written between words, punctuation marks use space on both sides of them. They can also appear at the very end of a line, regardless of where the preceding word ends. Red (cinnabar) ink is used in many manuscripts, to either symbolize emphasis or respect.

Numerals 

Mongolian numerals are either written from left to right, or from top to bottom.

Components and writing styles

Components 
Listed in the table below are letter components (graphemes) commonly used across the script. Some of these are used with several letters, and others to contrast between them. As their forms and usage may differ between writing styles, however, examples of these can be found under this section below.

Writing styles 
As exemplified in this section, the shapes of glyphs may vary widely between different styles of writing and choice of medium with which to produce them. The development of written Mongolian can be divided into the three periods of pre-classical (beginning – 17th century), classical (16/17th century – 20th century), and modern (20th century onward):

 Rounded letterforms tend to be more prevalent with handwritten styles (compare printed and handwritten  'ten').

Such tails are used consistently for these letters in the earliest 13th to 15th century Uyghur Mongolian style of texts.

The handwritten form of final-shaped yodh, can be greatly shortened in comparison with its initial and medial forms.

 The definite status or function of diacritics was not established prior to classical Mongolian. Additionally, both  and  could be (double-)dotted to identify them regardless of their sound values. Final dotted  is also found in modern Mongolian words.
 When a bow-shaped consonant is followed by a vowel in Uyghur style text, said bow can be found to notably overlap it (see ). A final  has, in its final pre-modern form, a bow-less final form as opposed to the common modern one:

An example of this appears in the suffix 

 In pre-modern Mongolian, medial  forms a ligature: .
 A pre-modern variant form for final  appears in the shape of a short final  , derived from Old Uyghur zayin. It tended to be replaced by the mouth-shaped form and is no longer used. An early example of it is found in the name of Gengis Khan on the Stele of Yisüngge:  .

 Initial taw (/) can, akin to final mem, be found written quite explicitly loopy (as in  'book' and  'mirror'). The lamedh ( or ) may appear simply as an oval loop or looped shin, or as more angular, with an either closed or open counter (as in / or /). This was done in imitation of Old Uyghur which, however, had lacked the phoneme  in this position.

 Following the late classical Mongolian orthography of the 17th and 18th centuries, a smooth and angular tsade ( and ) has come to represent  and  respectively. The tsade before this was used for both these phonemes, regardless of graphical variants, as no  had existed in Old Uyghur:

Example

Gallery

Unicode 
The Mongolian script was added to the Unicode standard in September 1999 with the release of version 3.0. However, several design issues have been pointed out.

 The 1999 Mongolian script Unicode codes are duplicated and not searchable.
 The 1999 Mongolian script Unicode model has multiple layers of FVS (free variation selectors), MVS, ZWJ, NNBSP, and those variation selections conflict with each other, which create incorrect results. Furthermore, different vendors understood the definition of each FVS differently, and developed multiple applications in different standards.

Blocks 

The Unicode block for Mongolian is U+1800–U+18AF. It includes letters, digits and various punctuation marks for Hudum Mongolian, Todo Mongolian, Xibe (Manchu), Manchu proper, and Ali Gali, as well as extensions for transcribing Sanskrit and Tibetan.

The Mongolian Supplement block (U+11660–U+1167F) was added to the Unicode Standard in June 2016 with the release of version 9.0:

Keyboard layout 
The standard Mongolian traditional script keyboard layout for personal computers is as follows (note that the characters have been rotated 90 degrees counterclockwise):

See also 

 Mongolian writing systems
Mongolian script
Mongolian script multigraphs
Galik alphabet
Todo alphabet
ʼPhags-pa script
Horizontal square script
Soyombo script
Mongolian Latin alphabet
SASM/GNC romanization § Mongolian
Mongolian Cyrillic alphabet
Mongolian transliteration of Chinese characters

Mongolian Braille
 Mongolian Sign Language
 Mongolian name

Notes

References

External links 

 Keyboards Mongolian script layout online
 Lexilogos
 Typingbaba
 Branah.com

 Summaries
 University of Vienna: Grammar of Written Mongolian by Nicholas POPPE Index
 CJVlang: Making Sense of the Traditional Mongolian Script
 StudyMongolian: Written forms with audio pronunciation
 The Silver Horde: Mongol Scripts
 Lingua Mongolia: Uighur-script Mongolian Resources
 Omniglot: Mongolian Alphabet (note: contains several table inaccuracies regarding glyphs and transliterations)

 Studies
 (fr) Rémusat, Abel Récherches sur les langues tartares, Paris, 1820

 Grammars
 (ru) Schmidt, Isaak Jakob, Грамматика монгольскaго языка (Grammatika mongolʹskago i︠a︡zyka), Saint-Petersburg, 1832
 (ru) Bobrovnikov, Aleksieĭ Aleksandrovich Грамматика монгольско-калмыцкого языка (Grammatika mongolʹsko-kalmyt͡skago i͡azyka), Kazan, 1849
 (de) Schmidt, Isaak Jakob, Grammatik der mongolischen Sprache, St. Petersburg, 1831
 (fr) Soulié, Charles Georges, Éléments de grammaire mongole (dialecte ordoss), Paris, 1903
 (it) Puini, Carlo, Elementi della grammatica mongolica, Firenze, 1878

 Dictionaries
 (fr, ru) Kovalevskiĭ, Osip Mikhaĭlovich, Dictionnaire Mongol-Russe-Franca̧is, Volumes 1-3, Kazan 1844-46-49
 Bolor Dictionary
 Mongol toli dictionary: state dictionary of Mongolia

 Transliteration
 University of Virginia: Transliteration Schemes For Mongolian Vertical Script
 Online tool for Mongolian script transliteration
 Automatic converter for Traditional Mongolian and Cyrillic Mongolian by the Computer College of Inner Mongolia University

 Manuscripts
 Mongolian Manuscripts from Olon Süme – Yokohama Museum of EurAsian Cultures
 Digitised Mongolian manuscripts – The Royal Library, National Library of Denmark
 Mongolian texts – Digitales Turfan-Archiv, the Berlin-Brandenburg Academy of Sciences and Humanities
 Preservation of unique and historic newspapers printed in traditional Mongolian script between 1936-1945 – Endangered Archives Programme, British Library

 Other
 Official Mongolian script version of the People's Daily Online
 Office of the President of Mongolia website in Mongolian script
 

Alphabets
Mongolian writing systems
Articles containing Mongolian script text